Rothschild's cuscus (Phalanger rothschildi), also called the Obi Island cuscus, is a species of marsupial in the family Phalangeridae. It is endemic to the islands of Obi, Bisa and Obilatu in the Obi Islands of Maluku province, Indonesia.

References

Possums
Mammals of Indonesia
Mammals described in 1898
Taxa named by Oldfield Thomas
Taxonomy articles created by Polbot